Craw may refer to:

Craw (band), a math rock band from Cleveland, Ohio
Craw (surname), a surname (includes list)
Crop (anatomy), or craw, an anatomical structure
CRA-W (organization), the Committee on the Status of Women in Computing Research
CRAW (industrial certification), a Certified Robotic Arc Welder, per the American Welding Society (A.W.S.)